James Wootton (9 March 1860 – 21 February 1941) was an English first-class cricketer. Wootton was a left-handed batsman who bowled left-arm medium pace.

Wootton made his first-class debut for Kent in 1880 against Sussex. Wootton represented Kent in 115 first-class matches in from 1880 to 1890, with his final match for the county coming against the Marylebone Cricket Club. In his 115 matches for the county he scored 1,021 runs at a batting average of 7.34 and a high score of 40. With the ball he took 597 wickets at a bowling average of 17.14, with 49 five wicket hauls, 15 ten wicket hauls in a match and best figures of 8/27 against Lancashire in 1886. Wootton passed the 100 wickets mark in 1884, 1886 and 1887. Out of those the 1886 season was his best as he took 143 wickets at an average of 15.95, with 14 five wicket hauls, 10 five wicket hauls in a match and best figures of 8/27. In the field he took 62 catches for Kent.

In 1884 Wootton made his debut for the Marylebone Cricket Club against Nottinghamshire. Wootton played 18 first-class matches for the club from 1884 to 1891, with his final match for the club coming against Somerset. In his 18 matches for the club, he took 62 wickets at an average of 15.72, with 5 five wicket hauls, 2 ten wicket hauls in a match and best figures of 6/20.

Four years would pass before his next first-class appearance, during which time he served as the cricket coach at Winchester College.

In 1895 Wootton joined Hampshire, making his debut in the 1895 County Championship against Somerset. From 1895 to 1900 Wootton played 24 first-class matches for the county, with his final appearance coming in 1900 against Kent. In his 24 matches he scored 391 runs at an average of 12.62, with a single half century score of 53 against Somerset in 1896. With the ball he took 69 wickets at an average of 27.05, with 5 five wicket hauls and best figures of 5/37 against in 1895 against Leicestershire.

As well as playing first-class cricket for the above teams, Wootton also played first-class cricket for CI Thornton's XI, an England XI, H Philipson's XI, Lord March's XI at the Priory Park Ground, Players of the South and the South of England.

In Wootton's overall first-class career he scored 1,628 runs at an average of 7.98, with a single half century score of 53. With the ball he took 761 wickets at a bowling average of 18.16, with 60 five wicket hauls, 17 ten wicket hauls in a match and best figures of 8/27. In the field Hosie took 92 catches.

Wootton died at Leytonstone, Essex on 21 February 1941.

References

1860 births
1941 deaths
People from Sutton-at-Hone
English cricketers
Kent cricketers
North v South cricketers
Marylebone Cricket Club cricketers
Hampshire cricketers
English cricket coaches
Players of the South cricketers
C. I. Thornton's XI cricketers
H. Philipson's XI cricketers
Lord March's XI cricketers